Desosaminyl transferase EryCIII (EryCIII) is an enzyme with systematic name dTDP-3-dimethylamino-4,6-dideoxy-alpha-D-glucopyranose:3-alpha-mycarosylerythronolide B 3-dimethylamino-4,6-dideoxy-alpha-D-glucosyltransferase. This enzyme catalyses the following chemical reaction

 dTDP-3-dimethylamino-4,6-dideoxy-alpha-D-glucopyranose + 3-alpha-mycarosylerythronolide B  dTDP + erythromycin D

The enzyme is involved in erythromycin biosynthesis.

References

External links 

EC 2.4.1